Abdur Razzaq Iskander (1935 – 30 June 2021) was a Pakistani Islamic scholar and writer. He was the chancellor and senior hadith-professor of Jamia Uloom-ul-Islamia, emir of the Aalmi Majlis Tahaffuz Khatm-e-Nubuwwat and the president of Wifaqul Madaris in Pakistan. He was an alumnus of Darul Uloom Karachi, Jamia Uloom-ul-Islamia, Islamic University of Madinah and the Al-Azhar University. He authored books such as At-Tarīqat al-Asriyyah and Tahafuzz-e-Madāris.

Biography
Abdur Razzaq was born in 1935 into a religious family in Kokal, Abbottabad District. He was schooled at the Madrassa Darul Uloom Chohar Sharif, Haripur and the Ahmed Al-Madrassa Sikandarpur. He later studied at the Darul Uloom Karachi and graduated in the dars-e-nizami from the Jamia Uloom-ul-Islamia in 1956. He was the first student of dars-e-nizami at the Jamia Uloom-ul-Islamia. He later enrolled at the Islamic University of Madinah in 1962 and studied theology for four years. He completed his doctoral studies at the Al-Azhar University in 1972. He was an authorized disciple of Muhammad Yusuf Ludhianvi in Tasawwuf. His teachers include Muhammad Yousuf Banuri and Wali Hasan Tonki.

Abdur Razzaq started his teaching career in 1955. He became the Shaykh al-Hadith (senior professor of hadith) of the Jamia Uloom-ul-Islamia after Nizamuddin Shamzai, and the chancellor after the assassination of Habibullah Mukhtar in 1997. He was made a member of the working committee of the Wifaq ul Madaris in 1997 and appointed its vice-president in 2001. He later served as its interim president for nine months following the death of Saleemullah Khan. He was appointed the president on 5 October 2017.

In 1981, he was elected a member of the executive council of the Aalmi Majlis Tahaffuz Khatm-e-Nubuwwat (AMTKN). In 2008, he was appointed the central deputy-emir following Sayed Nafees al-Hussaini's death. In 2015, he succeeded Abdul Majeed Ludhianvi as the emir of AMTKN. He also served as the president of Ittehad-e-Tanzeemat-Madaris Pakistan.

In August 2016, speaking to a congregation at the Birmingham Central Mosque, Abdur Razzaq said that, "Islam is complete and it means that nothing can be added, removed or altered in it". He maintained that the people opposing the finality of prophethood have disconnected themselves from Muhammad.

Abdur Razzaq died on 30 June 2021 in Karachi. His death was condoled by Qamar Javed Bajwa, Shehbaz Sharif, Fazal-ur-Rehman, Shujaat Hussain, Chaudhry Pervaiz Elahi, Imran Ismail, Syed Mustafa Kamal and Anis Kaimkhani.

Literary works
Literary works of Abdur Razzaq include:
 At-Tarīqat al-Asriyyah (2 parts), this book is included in the curriculum of Wifaqul Madaris.
 Mushāhidāt va tāʼas̲s̲urāt : ʻālam-i Islām kī cand ʻaẓīm shak̲h̲ṣiyyāt kā taz̲kirah
 Taḥaffuz̤-i madāris aur ʻulmāʼ va t̤ulabāʼ se chand bāten̲
 Tablighi Jamaat and Principles and Methodology of its Dawah

References

1935 births
2021 deaths
People from Abbottabad District
Jamia Darul Uloom, Karachi alumni
Islamic University of Madinah alumni
Al-Azhar University alumni
Presidents of Wifaq ul Madaris Al-Arabia
Pakistani Islamic religious leaders
Pakistani Sunni Muslim scholars of Islam
Muslim missionaries
Pakistani religious writers
Emirs of Aalmi Majlis Tahaffuz Khatm-e-Nubuwwat
Aalmi Majlis Tahaffuz Khatm-e-Nubuwwat people
Wifaq ul Madaris Al-Arabia people
Chancellors of Jamia Uloom-ul-Islamia
Jamia Uloom-ul-Islamia alumni
Academic staff of Jamia Uloom-ul-Islamia
People from Karachi
Deobandis
Vice presidents of Wifaq ul Madaris Al-Arabia